Aponotoreas insignis (also known as the Alpine grassland orange) is a moth of the family Geometridae. It is endemic to New Zealand.

Taxonomy

This species was first described by Arthur Gardiner Butler in 1877 from specimens collected by James Hector and John Enys. Butler originally named the species Aspilates insignis. In 1986 Robin C. Craw described the new genus Aponotoreas and included A. insignis within it.

Behaviour 
This moth is day flying. Adults of the species can be found on the wing between January to March.

Habitat and hosts 
A. insignis prefers to inhabit tussock land on the mountain sides of the South Island. Larvae exist on species of Chionochloa and Poa.

References

External links

 Citizen science observations of Aponotoreas insignis
 Specimens held at the Auckland War Memorial Museum

Moths of New Zealand
Hydriomenini
Moths described in 1877
Endemic fauna of New Zealand
Endemic moths of New Zealand